Thoriq Ibrahim (born February 1, 1969) is the current Minister of Environment and Energy for the Maldives.  Ibrahim acquired a bachelor's degree in Engineering from Loughborough University of Technology in 1995, a master's degree in science from the National University of Singapore in 2002, and an MBA from Preston University in 2004. After finishing schooling, he took on a variety of engineering and project management work, most notably being the Project Director for the rebuilding nine houses that were damaged in the 2004 tsunami. He is also the chairman of the Alliance of Small Island States.  Ibrahim has been outwardly critical of US President Donald Trump's 2017 decision to withdraw America from the Paris agreement to combat climate change.

References 

1969 births
Alumni of Loughborough University
National University of Singapore alumni
Living people
Government ministers of the Maldives
Environment ministers